A Very Unlucky Leprechaun is a 1998 children's fantasy film starring Warwick Davis and directed by Brian Kelly in his feature film directorial debut. It was produced by Roger Corman, and written by Craig J. Nevius. The film debuted at the 1998 Galway Film Festival. The film was released on direct-to-video in the United States on August 18, 1998.

Plot
9-year-old Molly and her father move to a house in Ireland they've inherited nicknamed "Misfortune Manor". It brings bad luck to anyone who lives in it. When Molly discovers a leprechaun living on the grounds whose luck has run out too. Together, Molly and her new friend must work together to break the curse and it'll take more than a little bit of luck to save the day.

Cast
 Warwick Davis as Lucky
 Danielle and Stephanie Lombardi as Molly Wilson
 Tim Matheson as Howard Wilson
 Lisa Thornhill as Sharon Connor
 Mick Nolan as Mayor McGreedy
 Michael Dwyer as Derek McGreedy
 Donal Simmie as Erik McGreedy
 Jimmy Keogh as Mr. Mulligan
 Una Crawford O'Brien as Principal O'Boyle
 Philip Sweeney as Foreman, Starfish
 Des Gough as Maitre D'

References

External links
Unlucky Leprechaun at BFI
A Very Unlucky Leprechaun at Letterbox DVD
A Very Unlucky Leprechaun at IMDb

1998 films
1998 direct-to-video films
1998 directorial debut films
1998 fantasy films
1990s American films
1990s children's adventure films
1990s children's fantasy films
1990s English-language films
American children's adventure films
American children's fantasy films
Direct-to-video fantasy films
English-language Irish films
Films about father–daughter relationships
Films about friendship
Films shot in Ireland
Irish adventure films
Irish children's films
Irish fantasy films